Djidéo Abdoulaye (born 8 April 1988) is a former Chadian professional football player. He made six appearances for the Chad national football team.

See also
 List of Chad international footballers

References

External links
 

1988 births
Living people
Chadian footballers
Chad international footballers
Association football midfielders